Princess Olga Pskov International Airport ( )  is an airfield in Pskov Oblast, Russia located  southeast of Pskov.  

It is a medium air base with 27 large revetments in a complex, sprawling taxiway layout and home to the 334th Military Transport Aviation Regiment as part of the 12th Military Transport Aircraft Division of Military Transport Aviation which flies the Ilyushin Il-76. The civilian terminal area services 13 medium/large planes and 20 small planes.  There is no instrument landing capability.

The airfield dates to the 1930s, when it became a host base for one of the Soviet Airforce regiments. Under the German Nazi occupation it was used by the Luftwaffe to supply advancing Wehrmacht troops.

After the WWII the airport has mostly been used for commuter services to local airfields in Pskov oblast (Velikie Luki, Gdov, Samolva etc.) and for scheduled flights to Moscow, Leningrad, Riga, Tartu, Vitebsk, Kharkov, Simferopol and other destinations in the European part of the USSR. By 1955 intelligence sources reported four-engine aircraft operating on 2500-meter runways.  In the 1960s the airfield hosted about two dozen Antonov An-10 and Antonov An-12 turboprop transports.  In the 1970s the aircraft were upgraded to Ilyushin Il-76 jets, operated by the 334 VTAP (334th Military Transport Aviation Regiment).  In 1984 the airfield had a normal complement of 27 Il-76 aircraft.

In the 1990s regular flights were interrupted due to economic collapse which caused significant reduction in the demand for passenger and cargo air service and the closure of all local airfields in Pskov and Leningrad oblasts. After a short-lived air connection to Moscow operated by Eurasia Airlines in 2003, scheduled airline services were not resumed until May 2007. In the beginning these services were operated by St. Petersburg-based carrier Vyborg Airlines but have since been taken over by UTair Aviation and Atlant-Soyuz and later discontinued.
In 2009 two airlines announced they would serve the airport. Region-Avia started flights to Moscow-Vnukovo and airBaltic announced international services to its Riga hub. The latter services were cancelled in December 2009 due to the state of the runway during winter.

During the 2010s Pskovavia maintained scheduled flights to Moscow and St. Petersburg with An-24 and An-26 turboprops until the airline's license was revoked. In 2018 Azimuth airline began regular flights to Moscow with its Sukhoi Superjet 100. As of 2020, flights to five Russian airports are maintained.

Scheduled passenger flights are currently operated by Sukhoi Superjet, Bombardier CRJ and Let L-410.

Airlines and destinations

Statistics

References

External links

Russian Air Force bases
Soviet Air Force bases
Airports built in the Soviet Union
Airports in Pskov Oblast